Football Club Chambly Oise, commonly known as Chambly, is a French football club based in Chambly in the Hauts-de-France region. Their home stadium is the Stade des Marais in the town, and they compete in the Championnat National 2, the fourth tier of French football, as of the 2022–23 season.

History
The club was founded in 1989 and previously played in Ligue 2, the second division of French football, after achieving promotion from the Championnat National in 2019. They were relegated back in 2021. They previously won promotion from the Division d'Honneur in the 2009–10 season. The club's emblem and kits take a heavy influence from Italian club Inter Milan.

On 1 February 2017, Chambly achieved a club milestone by drawing with French top-flight outfit Monaco 3–3 during regulation time in a Coupe de la Ligue match, before eventually losing 4–5 in extra time. On 1 March 2018, Chambly defeated Strasbourg 1–0 to reach the semi-finals of the Coupe de France for the first time ever. However, the club suffered a personal tragedy as Walter Luzi, the club's founder, died in a hospital on the same day.

On 19 April 2019, the club achieved promotion to Ligue 2 for the first time in its history. Due to the promotion, the club would play its league matches in the 2019–20 Ligue 2 season at two venues; fifteen matches at the Stade Pierre Brisson, and four at the Stade Sébastien Charléty, as the Stade des Marais did not meet the standards for Ligue 2 football. The Stade des Marais was being upgraded to Ligue 2 standards, with a capacity of 3,000 envisioned. However, construction was temporary halted in December 2020.

After suffering relegation from Ligue 2 in 2021, Chambly continued with a relegation from the Championnat National in 2022, returning to the Championnat National 2. Ahead of the 2022–23 season, Fabien Valéri was appointed as head coach. It was the first time that Chambly began a season without a member of the Luzi family in the managerial position, with Bruno Luzi leaving the club earlier in the year.

Current squad
As of 9 October 2022.

References

 
Association football clubs established in 1989
1989 establishments in France
Chambly
Sport in Oise
Chambly